Nithin Jake Joseph is an Indian television actor who appears in Malayalam-language television shows. He is well known for his roles as Aadhithyan in the soap opera Neelakkuyil and Arjun in  Kaliveedu.

Career

Nithin has played minor roles in feature films Anuraga Karikkin Vellam (2016) and The Great Father (2017). He has also played the lead roles in the feature film Mashipachayum Kallupencilum and the short film Akshitha (2021).

He made his television debut through the mythological television series Manjal Prasadam aired in Flowers from 2016 to 2017. He played the role of Eshwar, a herpetologist. The show won the Kerala State Television Award in 2017 for the Second Best Tele-serial. 

He then played the titular character of Adhityan in Asianet's popular soap-opera drama Neelakkuyil. His popularity from the show gained him a spot in the "Most Desirable Men on Television" list published by The Times of India in 2019. 

He played a doting younger brother, Harikrishnan in his third serial Jeevitha Nouka telecasted on Mazhavil Manorama. He is currently playing the lead role of Arjun in the ongoing series Kaliveedu, which is an official remake of the successful Tamil show Roja.

Filmography

Films

Television

Webseries

Awards and nominations

Personal life 
Nithin is an engineer-turned-actor. He is married to Angitha. They have a son, Adam. He joined the Bharatiya Janata Party in 2019.

References

External links
 

Living people
Indian television actors
Indian male film actors
21st-century Indian male actors
Male actors in Malayalam cinema
Indian male television actors
Male actors in Malayalam television
Year of birth missing (living people)
Place of birth missing (living people)